Unto is a Finnish masculine given name. People with the name include:

Unto Elo (born 1944), Finnish sprint canoeist 
Unto Hautalahti (born 1936), Finnish cyclist
Unto Korhonen (born 1931), Finnish diplomat
Unto Mononen (1930–1968), Finnish musician
Unto Nevalainen (born 1935), Finnish football player
Unto Ojonen (1909–1997), Finnish architect
Unto Raisa (born 1934), Finnish chess player
Unto Valpas (1944–2016), Finnish politician
Unto Venäläinen (born 1944), Finnish chess player
Unto Wiitala (1925–2019), Finnish ice hockey player 

Finnish masculine given names